Red Bridge may refer to:

Structures
Red Bridge (border), on the border between Georgia and Azerbaijan
Red Bridge, Yerevan, Armenia
Red Bridge (Tasmania), Australia
Félix-Gabriel-Marchand Bridge (known locally as the Red Bridge), Mansfield-et-Pontefract, Quebec, Canada
Grand Duchess Charlotte Bridge, in Luxembourg City, Luxembourg, more commonly known as the Red Bridge owing to its distinctive colour
Red Bridge (Saint Petersburg), Russia
Red Bridge (Chernihiv), Ukraine

United States
Red Bridge (Meriden, Connecticut), NRHP-listed
Red Bridge (Monroe, Iowa), NRHP-listed
Red Bridge (Postville, Iowa), NRHP-listed
Red Bridge (Silverton, Washington), listed on the NRHP in Snohomish County, Washington
Covered Bridge (Cedarburg, Wisconsin), originally Red Bridge, NRHP-listed
Red Bridge (Rhode Island) or Henderson Bridge, between Providence and East Providence
Red Bridge, over Wissahickon Creek in Pennsylvania
Red Bridge Hydro, Wilbraham, Massachusetts

Other uses
The Red Bridge, an 1895 painting by Julian Alden Weir
Hongqiao District (meaning "Red Bridge"), a district in Tianjin, China

See also
 Redbridge (disambiguation)
 Red Boardwalk Bridge, Thailand